Julien Lon Tinkle (March 20, 1906 – January 11, 1980) was a historian, writer, book critic, and professor who specialized in the history of Texas.  Tinkle spent most of his life in Dallas, Texas, where he graduated from and later taught at Southern Methodist University.  In 1942 he became a book editor and critic for the Dallas Morning News.  His first book, Thirteen Days to Glory: The Siege of the Alamo, was published in 1958.  The book was well received and was later adapted into a made-for-television movie.  Tinkle won awards for this book, and for a biography that he wrote of historian J. Frank Dobie.  He is the namesake of the Texas Institute of Letters' lifetime achievement award.

Personal life and education
Tinkle was born in Dallas, Texas on March 20, 1906 to James Ward Tinkle and Mary (née Garden hire) Tinkle.  He attended Southern Methodist University in Dallas, where he earned a Bachelor of Arts degree in 1927 and a Master of Arts degree in 1932.  Tinkle then moved to Paris, where he studied at the Sorbonne.  After earning a degree from the Sorbonne in 1933, Tinkle spent some time doing post-graduate work at Columbia University.  On December 27, 1939 he married Maria Ofelia Garza; they had three sons.

Career
After completing his post-graduate work, Tinkle accepted a position as an instructor at his alma mater, Southern Methodist University.  He eventually became the school's E. A. Lilly Professor of Literature.  In 1942 he began working as a book editor and critic for the Dallas Morning News.  According to Evelyn Oppenheimer in her book A Book Lover in Texas, after Tinkle became the book editor, "book reviewing in The Dallas Morning News rose to a level of notable quality and was nationally recognized".

Tinkle's first book, Thirteen Days to Glory: The Siege of the Alamo, was published in 1958. It was only the second full-length, non-fiction book to be published about the Battle of the Alamo, following John Myers Myers' 1948 book, The Alamo.  A.C. Greene, a book critic at a competing Dallas newspaper, listed Thirteen Days to Glory in his book The 50+ Best Books on Texas in 1998.  According to Greene, Tinkle's book "gives the essence of the Alamo story without attempting to exhaust history's explanation", and "is more revealing of the minds and wills that were behind the fateful decision to stay on to death" than other, later treatments of the battle. The book won two awards in 1959, from the Texas Institute of Letters and the Sons of the Republic of Texas. In the 1980s, it was adapted into a made-for-television movie, The Alamo: Thirteen Days to Glory, which historian Albert Nofi regards as the most historically accurate of all Alamo films.  In 1985, the book was reprinted by Texas A&M University Press.

After Thirteen Days to Glory was published, Tinkle was hired as a historical advisor for John Wayne's film about the battle, The Alamo, which was released in 1960. Although screenwriter James Edward Grant claimed to have done extensive historical research, according to historian Timothy Todish "there is not a single scene in The Alamo which corresponds to an historically verifiable incident", and Tinkle and fellow historical advisor J. Frank Dobie demanded that their names be removed from the credits.  Tinkle was also paid $800 for allowing the title of his book to be used in the theme song for this movie.

He wrote several other books about the Battle of the Alamo, and about Dallas and Texas history, as well as two biographies of historian J. Frank Dobie. His last biography of Dobie, An American Original: The Life of J. Frank Dobie, won a 1979 prize from the Texas Institute of Letters.  Tinkle was named to the Ordre des Palmes Académiques in France, and received an honorary doctorate from St. Mary's University in San Antonio, Texas in 1963. From 1949 until 1952, Tinkle served as president of the Texas Institute of Letters.  The institute has since named its lifetime achievement award for Tinkle.  He was also a member of the Philosophical Society of Texas.

Bibliography

As author
Thirteen Days to Glory: The Siege of the Alamo (1958)
The Story of Oklahoma (1962)
The Valiant Few; Crisis at the Alamo  (1964)
Miracle in Mexico: The Story of Juan Diego (1965)
The Key to Dallas (1965)
J. Frank Dobie: The Makings of an Ample Mind (1968)
Mr. De: A Biography of Everette Lee DeGolyer (1970)
An American Original: The Life of J. Frank Dobie (1978)

As editor
The Cowboy Reader (1969), with Allen Maxwell
Treson Nobel: An Anthology of French Nobel Prize-Winners (1963), with Wynn Rickey

References

1906 births
1980 deaths
Historians of Texas
People from Dallas
Southern Methodist University alumni
University of Paris alumni
Columbia University alumni
Southern Methodist University faculty
Historians of the Texas Revolution
Recipients of the Ordre des Palmes Académiques
The Dallas Morning News people
20th-century American historians
American male non-fiction writers
Journalists from Texas
20th-century American journalists
American male journalists
Historians from Texas
20th-century American male writers